The Early Cyrillic alphabet, also called classical Cyrillic or paleo-Cyrillic, is a writing system that was developed in Medieval Bulgaria in the Preslav Literary School during the late 9th century. The modern Cyrillic script is used for some Slavic languages (such as Macedonian, Serbian, Russian, Ukrainian), and for East European and Asian languages that have experienced a great amount of Russian cultural influence.

History 
The earliest form of manuscript Cyrillic, known as ustav, was based on Greek uncial script, augmented by ligatures and by letters from the Glagolitic alphabet for consonants not found in Greek.

The Glagolitic alphabet was created by the monk Saint Cyril, possibly with the aid of his brother Saint Methodius, around 863. Cyrillic, on the other hand, was a creation of Cyril's students in the 890s at the Preslav Literary School as a more suitable script for church books, based on uncial Greek but retaining some Glagolitic letters for sounds not present in Greek. An alternative hypothesis proposes that it emerged in the border regions of Greek proselytization to the Slavs before it was codified and adapted by some systematizer among the Slavs; the oldest Cyrillic manuscripts look very similar to 9th and 10th century Greek uncial manuscripts, and the majority of uncial Cyrillic letters were identical to their Greek uncial counterparts. One possibility is that this systematization of Cyrillic was undertaken at the Council of Preslav in 893, when the Old Church Slavonic liturgy was adopted by the First Bulgarian Empire.

The Cyrillic alphabet was very well suited for the writing of Old Church Slavic, generally following a principle of "one letter for one significant sound", with some arbitrary or phonotactically-based exceptions. Particularly, this principle is violated by certain vowel letters, which represent  plus the vowel if they are not preceded by a consonant. It is also violated by a significant failure to distinguish between /ji/ and /jĭ/ orthographically. There was no distinction of capital and lowercase letters, though manuscript letters were rendered larger for emphasis, or in various decorative initial and nameplate forms. Letters served as numerals as well as phonetic signs; the values of the numerals were directly borrowed from their Greek-letter analogues. Letters without Greek equivalents mostly had no numeral values, whereas one letter, koppa, had only a numeric value with no phonetic value.

Since its creation, the Cyrillic script has adapted to changes in spoken language and developed regional variations to suit the features of national languages. It has been the subject of academic reforms and political decrees. Variations of the Cyrillic script are used to write languages throughout Eastern Europe and Asia.

The form of the Russian alphabet underwent a change when Tsar Peter the Great introduced the civil script (or), in contrast to the prevailing church typeface, in 1708. (The two forms are sometimes distinguished as paleo-Cyrillic and neo-Cyrillic.) Some letters and breathing marks which were used only for historical reasons were dropped. Medieval letterforms used in typesetting were harmonized with Latin typesetting practices, exchanging medieval forms for Baroque ones, and skipping the western European Renaissance developments. The reform subsequently influenced Cyrillic orthographies for most other languages. Today, the early orthography and typesetting standards remain in use only in Church Slavonic.

A comprehensive repertoire of early Cyrillic characters has been included in the Unicode standard since version 5.1, published April 4, 2008. These characters and their distinctive letterforms are represented in specialized computer fonts for Slavistics.

Alphabet 

In addition to the basic letters, there were a number of scribal variations, combining ligatures, and regionalisms used, all of which varied over time.

Sometimes the Greek letters that were used in Cyrillic mainly for their numeric value are transcribed with the corresponding Greek letters for accuracy: ѳ = θ, ѯ = ξ, ѱ = ψ, ѵ = υ, and ѡ = ω.

Numerals, diacritics and punctuation 

Each letter had a numeric value also, inherited from the corresponding Greek letter. A titlo over a sequence of letters indicated their use as a number; usually this was accompanied by a dot on either side of the letter. In numerals, the ones place was to the left of the tens place, the reverse of the order used in modern Arabic numerals. Thousands are formed using a special symbol,  (U+0482), which was attached to the lower left corner of the numeral. Many fonts display this symbol incorrectly as being in line with the letters instead of subscripted below and to the left of them.

Titlos were also used to form abbreviations, especially of nomina sacra; this was done by writing the first and last letter of the abbreviated word along with the word's grammatical endings, then placing a titlo above it. Later manuscripts made increasing use of a different style of abbreviation, in which some of the left-out letters were superscripted above the abbreviation and covered with a pokrytie diacritic.

Several diacritics, adopted from Polytonic Greek orthography, were also used, but were seemingly redundant (these may not appear correctly in all web browsers; they are supposed to be directly above the letter, not off to its upper right):

   trema, diaeresis (U+0308)
   varia (grave accent), indicating stress on the last syllable (U+0300)
   oksia (acute accent), indicating a stressed syllable (Unicode U+0301)
   titlo, indicating abbreviations, or letters used as numerals (U+0483)
   kamora (circumflex accent), indicating palatalization (U+0484); in later Church Slavonic, it disambiguates plurals from homophonous singulars.
   dasia or dasy pneuma, rough breathing mark (U+0485)
   psili, zvatel'tse, or psilon pneuma, soft breathing mark (U+0486). Signals a word-initial vowel, at least in later Church Slavonic.
   Combined zvatel'tse and varia is called apostrof.
   Combined zvatel'tse and oksia is called iso.

Punctuation systems in early Cyrillic manuscripts were primitive: there was no space between words and no upper and lower case, and punctuation marks were used inconsistently in all manuscripts.

   ano teleia (U+0387), a middle dot used to separate phrases, words, or parts of words
   Full stop, used in the same way
   Armenian full stop (U+0589), resembling a colon, used in the same way
   Georgian paragraph separator (U+10FB), used to mark off larger divisions
   triangular colon (U+2056, added in Unicode 4.1), used to mark off larger divisions
   diamond colon (U+2058, added in Unicode 4.1), used to mark off larger divisions
   quintuple colon (U+2059, added in Unicode 4.1), used to mark off larger divisions
   Greek question mark (U+037E), similar to a semicolon

Some of these marks are also used in Glagolitic script.

Used only in modern texts

   comma (U+002C)
   full stop (U+002E)
   exclamation mark (U+0021)

Gallery

Old Bulgarian examples

Medieval Greek Uncial manuscripts from which early Cyrillic letter forms take their shapes

Early Cyrillic manuscripts

See also 

 Relationship of Cyrillic and Glagolitic scripts
 Bosnian Cyrillic
 Romanian Cyrillic alphabet
 Reforms of Russian orthography
 Nationalism in the Middle Ages#Eastern Orthodox Church, Byzantium, Slavs and Greeks

References

Sources 

 Berdnikov, Alexander and Olga Lapko, EuroTEX ’99 Proceedings, September 1999
 Birnbaum, David J., September 28, 2002
 Cubberley, Paul (1996) "The Slavic Alphabets". In Daniels and Bright, below.
 Daniels, Peter T., and William Bright, eds. (1996). The World's Writing Systems. Oxford University Press. .
 Everson, Michael and Ralph Cleminson, September 4, 2003
 Franklin, Simon. 2002. Writing, Society and Culture in Early Rus, c. 950–1300. Cambridge University Press. .
Iliev, I. Short History of the Cyrillic Alphabet. Plovdiv. 2012/Иван Г. Илиев. Кратка история на кирилската азбука. Пловдив. 2012. Short History of the Cyrillic Alphabet
 Lev, V., "The history of the Ukrainian script (paleography)", in Ukraine: a concise encyclopædia, volume 1. University of Toronto Press, 1963, 1970, 1982. 
 Simovyc, V., and J. B. Rudnyckyj, "The history of Ukrainian orthography", in Ukraine: a concise encyclopædia, volume 1 (op cit).
 Zamora, J., Help me learn Church Slavonic
 Azbuka, Church Slavonic calligraphy and typography.
 Obshtezhitie.net, Cyrillic and Glagolitic manuscripts and early printed books.

External links
 Old Cyrillic [Стара Славянска Език] text entry application
 Slavonic Computing Initiative
 churchslavonic – Typesetting documents in Church Slavonic language using Unicode
 fonts-churchslavonic – Fonts for typesetting in Church Slavonic language
 Church Slavonic Typography in Unicode (Unicode Technical Note no. 41), 2015-11-04, accessed 2016-02-23.

Cyrillic alphabets
Preslav Literary School
History of writing
1st-millennium establishments in Europe
Western calligraphy
Golden Age of medieval Bulgarian culture
Medieval scripts
Eastern Orthodox Christian culture